Acara may refer to:

Fish
 Blue acara, a colorful freshwater fish
 Zebra acara, a tropical freshwater fish

Places
 Acara (region) or Adjara, a former region of the Ottoman Empire in present-day Georgia
 Acará, a municipality in Pará, Brazil

Other uses
 Amarillo Citizens Against Repent Amarillo, a group opposing spiritual mapping
 Australian Curriculum, Assessment and Reporting Authority, an independent authority responsible for the development of a national Australian curriculum
 Ācāra, community norms in classical Hindu law

See also
 Akara, a fritter made from cowpeas